Justus Jorgensen (12 May 1893 – 15 May 1975) was an Australian artist and architect. He is best known for establishing the artist colony Montsalvat, located in Eltham.

He was born in East Brighton, Melbourne. He was a student of Max Meldrum and an early member of his Australian tonalist movement.

References 

1893 births
1975 deaths
20th-century Australian artists
Artists from Melbourne
20th-century Australian architects
People from Brighton, Victoria
People from Eltham, Victoria
Australian people of Norwegian descent
National Gallery of Victoria Art School alumni